Table tennis was contested at the 1994 Asian Games in Asakita Ward Sports Center, Hiroshima, Japan from 5 October 1994 to 14 October 1994.

Table tennis had team, doubles and singles events for men and women, as well as a mixed doubles competition.

Medalists

Medal table

References

 Results

External links
 ITTF Database

 
1994 Asian Games events
1994
Asian Games
1994 Asian Games